Dombrovka is a rural locality (a village) in Yazykovsky Selsoviet, Blagovarsky District, Bashkortostan, Russia. The population was 388 as of 2010. There are 2 streets.

Geography 
Dombrovka is located 13 km north of Yazykovo (the district's administrative centre) by road. Khlebodarovka is the nearest rural locality.

References 

Rural localities in Blagovarsky District